Kiryl Maskevich is a Belarusian Greco-Roman wrestler. He is a silver medalist at both the World Wrestling Championships and the European Wrestling Championships. He also represented Belarus at the 2020 Summer Olympics held in Tokyo, Japan in the men's 87 kg event.

Career 

He won one of the bronze medals in the 87 kg event at the 2019 World U23 Wrestling Championship in Budapest, Hungary. In 2020, he was eliminated in his first match in the 87 kg event at the European Wrestling Championships held in Rome, Italy. In that same year, he won the gold medal in the 87 kg event at the 2020 Individual Wrestling World Cup held in Belgrade, Serbia.

In 2021, he won the silver medal in the 87 kg event at the European Wrestling Championships held in Warsaw, Poland. In 2022, he won the gold medal in the 87 kg event at the Dan Kolov & Nikola Petrov Tournament held in Veliko Tarnovo, Bulgaria.

Achievements

References

External links 
 

Living people
Place of birth missing (living people)
Belarusian male sport wrestlers
European Wrestling Championships medalists
World Wrestling Championships medalists
Wrestlers at the 2020 Summer Olympics
1998 births
Olympic wrestlers of Belarus
21st-century Belarusian people